Giovanni “Johnny” Lurani Cernuschi, VIII Count of Calvenzano (December 19, 1905 – January 17, 1995) was an Italian automobile engineer, racing car driver and journalist.

He studied engineering at the Politecnico di Milano and raced cars such as
Salmson, Derby, Alfa Romeo and Maserati, participating eleven times in the Mille Miglia. Lurani took class wins in the event three times: 1933 in an MG K3, 1948 in a Healey and 1952 in a Porsche.

After partaking in the second Italo-Abyssinian War from 1935 to 1936, Lurani founded the racing team Scuderia Ambrosiana in 1937 along with Luigi Villoresi and Franco Cortese (1937). Sustaining a bad hip injury in a Maserati 4CM at Crystal Palace, Lurani ended his single-seater career in 1938 but continued racing sportscars until 1953.

After World War II Lurani became more involved in administration and politics, working with the FIA, where he initiated GT in 1949 and Formula Junior in 1959.

He also designed record breaking cars based on Moto Guzzi engines. In 1935 the Nibbio 1 was the first 500cc car to exceed 100 mph. The 350cc Moto Guzzi powered Nibbio 2 broke long distance records at Monza in 1956. He was president of the FIM (Fédération Internationale de Motocyclisme) Sporting Commission for several years. 
In 1971 he won the prestigious Premio Bancarella Sport literary prize for his book Storia delle Macchine da Corsa (History of Race Cars)

Publications
Auto Italiana, which he founded and edited
Nuvolari (Cassell & Company Ltd., 1959).  With Luigi Marinatto.
La storia delle macchine da corsa (1970).  Translation History of the racing car:  Man and machine (1972)
La storia della Mille Miglia 1927-57 (1979).
Alfa Romeo: Catalogo ragionato (1982).  With Paolo Altieri.
Racing around the world 1920-35.
  NUVOLARI. Legendary Champion of International Auto Racing. (1959) Sports Car Press

Racing record

Complete European Championship results
(key) (Races in bold indicate pole position) (Races in italics indicate fastest lap)

24 Hours of Le Mans results

References

Italian racing drivers
Italian motorcycle designers
Italian male journalists
Formula One journalists and reporters
Motoring journalists
Racing drivers from Milan
1905 births
1995 deaths
Polytechnic University of Milan alumni
Formula One team owners
Italian motorsport people
European Championship drivers
20th-century Italian journalists
20th-century Italian male writers